(Main list of acronyms)


 f – (s) Femto
 F – (s) Farad – Fluorine

FA 
 fa – (s) Persian language (ISO 639-1 code)
 FA – Food Addicts in Recovery Anonymous
 fA – (s) Femtoampere
 FA
 (i) Field Artillery
 Financial aid
 Football Association (England)
 Football Australia (governing body for association football)
 FAA
 (i) U.S. Federal Aviation Administration
 Financial Aid Administrator
 Fleet Air Arm
 Functional Area Analysis
 FAAD – (a) Forward Area Air Defence
 FAADEZ – (i) Forward Area Air Defence Engagement Zone
 FAAN – (i) Fellow of the American Academy of Neurology
 FAAFP – (i)Fellow of the American Academy of Family Physicians
 FAAN – (i) Fellow of the American Academy of Nursing
 FAANG – Facebook, Amazon, Apple, Netflix, Google (the leading stocks in the late-2010s US market rally) (c.f. FANG, which originally did not include Apple)
 FAAQ – (a/i) Frequently Asked and Anticipated Questions (cf. FAQ)
 FAASV – (i) Field Artillery Ammunition Supply Vehicle
 FAB – (i) Feline Advisory Bureau (UK feline charity)
 FAC
 FACF - Fully Automatic Capsule Filler source
 (i) Forward Air Controller
 Front of Allies for Change
 Frontal Affinity Chromatography
 Full Aperture Calibrator
 FACA – (a) (US) Federal Advisory Committee Act
 FACH – (a) Fuerza Aérea de Chile
 FACN – (i) Fellow of the American College of Nutrition
 FACP – (i) Fellow of the American College of Physicians
 FACS
 (i) Fellow of the American College of Surgeons
 (a) Formal Aspects of Computing Science
 Fluorescent-activated cell sorting
 FACTS – (a) Flexible Alternating Current Transmission System
 FAD
 (i) Flavin Adenine Dinucleotide
 Fuck A Duck
 (a) Funding Authorization Document
 M18 FADAC – (p) Field Artillery Data Computer
 FAFSA – (a) Free Application for Federal Student Aid (US)
 FAH
 (i) Federation of American Hospitals
 Fine Arts and Humanities
 Foreign Affairs Handbook
 FAI
 (i) Fédération Aéronautique Internationale (French, "International Aeronautics Federation")
 Football Association of Ireland
 FAM – (i) Foreign Affairs Manual
 fao – (s) Faroese language (ISO 639-2 code)
 FAO – (i) Food and Agriculture Organization
 FAPA – Fellow of the American Psychological Association
 FAPHA – Fellow of the American Public Health Association
 FAQ – (a/i) Frequently Asked Questions (sometimes pronounced "fak")
 FARC – (a) Fuerzas Armadas Revolucionarias de Colombia (Spanish, "Revolutionary Armed Forces of Colombia")
 FARDC – (a) "Military of the Democratic Republic of the Congo 
 FARP – (a) Forward Arming and Refuelling Point / Forward Area Rearm/refuel Point
 fas – (s) Persian language (ISO 639-2 code)
 FAS
 (i) Federation of American Scientists
 Fetal Alcohol Syndrome
 FASCAM – (p) Family of Scatterable Mines
 FASD – (i) Fetal Alcohol Spectrum Disorder
 FASEB – (a/i) Federation of American Societies for Experimental Biology
 FAST
 (a) Face, Arm, Speech, Time (stroke symptoms)
 Five hundred meter Aperture Spherical Telescope (Chinese radio telescope)
 Fixing America's Surface Transportation Act (U.S. legislation)
 FAT – (a) Field Artillery Tractor – File Allocation Table
 FAVS – (a) Future Armoured Vehicle System
 FAW – (i) Football Association of Wales

FB
 FB – Facebook, An on-line social network
 FBCB2 or FBCB2 – (p) Force XXI Battle Command, Brigade-and-Below
 FBCS – (i) Fellow of the British Computer Society
 FBI – (i) Federal Bureau of Investigation
 FBIS – (i) Foreign Broadcast Information Service
 FBIDST – (i) Fellow of the British Institute of Dental and Surgical Technologists
 FBM – (s) Board foot
 FBR
 (i) Fast Breeder Reactor
 Foundation for Biomedical Research
 Friedman, Billings, Ramsey (now known as Arlington Asset Investment)
 FBS
 Federal Bureau of Statistics (Pakistan)
 Fetal bovine serum
 Football Bowl Subdivision (U.S. college football)
 Fukuoka Broadcasting Corporation

FC 
 fC – (s) Femtocoulomb
 FC
 (i) Fire Control
 Football Club
 (s) Funnel Cloud (METAR Code)
 FCA
 (i) Fellowship of Christian Athletes
 Fiat Chrysler Automobiles
 Fraction of Combat Active forces
 FCC – (i) U.S. Federal Communications Commission
 FCE – (i) First Certificate in English 
 FCF – (i) Financial Free Cash Flow
 FCLA – Fraud Claims Law Associate
 FCM
 (i) Federation of Canadian Municipalities
 Fogarty's Cove Music
 FCO – (i) UK Foreign and Commonwealth Office
 FCS
 (i) Football Championship Subdivision (U.S. college football)
 Future Combat System
 FCSB – (i) Fotbal Club Steaua București, a name claimed by two association football clubs in Bucharest – FCSB and CSA Steaua București
 FCW – (i) Florida Championship Wrestling
 FCW - Forward Collision Warning, see Collision avoidance system
 FCZ – (i) Forward Combat Zone

FD 
 FD – (i) Falun Dafa
 FDA – (i) Food and Drug Administration (U.S.)
 FDBK – (i) Feedback
 FDC
 (i) Federal Detention Center (U.S.)
 Fire Direction Centre
 FDDI – (i) Fibre Distributed Data Interface
 FdI – (i) Fratelli d'Italia (Italian, "Brothers of Italy"), an Italian political party
 FDI
 (i) Fault detection and isolation
 Films Division of India, a government film production agency
 Flexible Display Interface
 Foreign direct investment
 Frégate de défense et d'intervention (French, "Defense and Intervention Frigate"), a planned class of French Navy ships
 FDR
 (i) Flight data recorder
 Franklin Delano Roosevelt

FE 
 Fe – (s) Iron (Latin Ferrum)
 FE – (i) Fully Exposed (armoured vehicle target, as opposed to Hull-Down)
 FEAR – (a) First Encounter Assault Recon – False Evidence Appears Real
 FEAST – (a/i) Forum for European-Australian Science and Technology Cooperation
 FEATS – (a) Festival of European Anglophone Theatrical Societies
 FEB
 (i) Federación Española de Baloncesto (Spanish, "Spanish Basketball Federation")
 Federatie Eredivisie Basketball (Dutch, "Federation Honorary Division (of) Basketball"), the former name of the basketball competition later known in Dutch by the English-language Dutch Basketball League
 Força Expedicionária Brasileira (Portuguese, "Brazilian Expeditionary Force")
 FEBA – (a) Forward Edge of the Battle Area
 fec. – (p) fecit (Latin, "he made it")
 FED – (a/i) Field emission display
 FEDEP – (p) Federation Development Process (Simulation)
 FEF – (i) Frontal Eye Field (neurophysiology)
 FEI – (i) Fédération équestre internationale (French, "International Federation for Equestrian Sports")
 FEMA
 (a/i) Farm Equipment Manufacturers Association
 (a/i) U.S. Federal Emergency Management Agency
 Fire Equipment Manufacturers' Association
 FEMEXFUT – (p) Federación Mexicana de Fútbol Asociación (Spanish, "Mexican Association Football Federation")
 FENAFUTH – (p) Federación Nacional Autónoma de Fútbol de Honduras (Spanish, "National Autonomous Football Federation of Honduras")
 FENS – (a/i) Federation of European Neuroscience Societies
 FEP – (i) Firepower Enhancement Program – Fleet satellite (FLTSAT) Extremely high frequency (EHF) Package
 FEPAFUT – (p) Federación Panameña de Fútbol (Spanish, "Panamanian Football Federation")
 FES – (i) Flywheel Energy Storage
 FEST – (a) Frankfurt English Speaking Theatre
 FET – (a) Field-effect transistor
 FEZ – (a/i) Fighter Engagement Zone

FF 
 ff – (s) Fula language (ISO 639-1 code)
 fF – (s) Femtofarad
 FF
 (i) Final Fantasy
 (p) Firefox (Web browser)
 FFA
 (i) Football Federation Australia, former name of the governing body now known as Football Australia
 Pacific Islands Forum Fisheries Agency
 Free-Fire Area
 Fusiform Face Area
 Future Farmers of America (today the National FFA Organization)
 FFB – (i) Frum From Birth (referring to an observant Jew born into a religiously observant family)
 FFC – (i) Free For Chat
 FFCM — Fellow of the Faculty of Community Medicine (fellowship created in 1972, now replaced by FFPH)
 FFE – (i) Fukuoka Futures Exchange
 FFF – (i) Fédération française de football (French, "French Football Federation")
 FFG – (s) Guided Missile Frigate (hull classification symbol)
 FFOV – (i) Forward Field Of View
 FFP - (i) Federally Funded Participation
 FFPH — Fellow of the Faculty of Public Health, replacing FFPHM
 FFR – (i) Fédération française de rugby (French, "French Rugby (Union) Federation")
 FFS – (i) For Fuck's Sake
 FFT
 (i) Fast Fourier transform
 Final Fantasy Tactics

FG 
 FG – (i) Falun Gong
 fg – (s) Femtogram
 FG – (s) Fog (METAR Code) – French Guiana (FIPS 10-4 territory code)
 FGR – (a) Flickr Group Roulette

FH 
 fH – (s) Femtohenry
 FHFIF – (i) Foster's Home for Imaginary Friends
 FHI – (i) Family Health International, Fuji Heavy Industries, Ltd.

FI 
 fi – (s) Finnish language (ISO 639-1 code)
 FI – (s) Finland (ISO 3166 digram; FIPS 10-4 country code)
 FIA – (a) Fédération internationale de l'automobile (French "International Automobile Federation")
 FIAT – (a) Fabbrica Italiana Automobili Torino (Italian "Italian Car Factory of Turin")
 FIB – (a) Fucking Illinois Bastard (Wisconsin slang, variants exist)
 FIBA – originally (a) Fédération internationale de basket-ball amateur (French, "International Amateur Basketball Federation"); since 1989, (p) Fédération internationale de basket-ball
 FIBUA – (i/a) Fighting In Built-Up Areas
 FIC – (i) Fellowship for Intentional Community
 FID – (i) Foreign Internal Defence
 FIDÉ – (a) Fédération internationale des échecs (French, "World Chess Federation")
 FIE – (i) Fly-In Echelon
 FIFA – (a) Fédération internationale de football association (French, "International Association Football Federation")
 FIFe – (a) Fédération internationale féline (French, "International Feline Federation")
 FIFO – (a) First In, First Out
 FIFRA – (a) Federal Insecticide, Fungicide, and Rodenticide Act
 FIG
 (i) Fédération internationale des géomètres (French, "International Federation of Surveyors")
 Fédération internationale de gymnastique (French, "International Federation of Gymnastics")
 Feminist Improvising Group (music ensemble)
 FIGJAM – (a) Fuck I'm Good, Just Ask Me
 fij – (s) Fijian language (ISO 639-2 code)
 FILA – (a) Fédération internationale des luttes associées (French, "International Federation of Associated Wrestling Styles"), former name of the sport governing body now known as United World Wrestling
 FILO – (a) First In, Last Out (see also LIFO)
 FIMPT – (i) Fellow of the Institute of Maxillofacial Prosthetists and Technologists
 fin – (s) Finnish language (ISO 639-2 code)
 FIN – (s) Finland (ISO 3166 trigram)
 FINA – (p/a) Fédération internationale de natation (French, "International Swimming Federation")
 FIPS – (a) Federal Information Processing Standard
 FIR
 (i) Final Inspection Report
 Federazione Italiana Rugby (Italian, "Italian Rugby (Union) Federation")
 FIRES – Fever Induced Refractory Epilepsy Syndrome or Febrile Infection-Related Epilepsy Syndrome
 FIS – (a/i) Fédération internationale de ski (French "International Ski Federation")
 FISA – (a) Fédération Internationale des Sociétés d'Aviron (French, "International Federation of Rowing Associations")
 FISH – (a) Fluorescence In-Situ Hybridisation
 FiST – (p) Fire Support Team
 FITS – (a) Flexible Image Transport System
 FIU – (i) Florida International University

FJ 
 fj – (s) Fijian language (ISO 639-1 code)
 fJ – (s) Femtojoule
 FJ – (s) Fiji (ISO 3166 digram; FIPS 10-4 country code)
 FJD – (s) Fiji dollar (ISO 4217 currency code)
 FJI – (s) Fiji (ISO 3166 trigram)
 FJN – (a) Financial Job Network

FK 
 fK – (s) Femtokelvin
 FK – (s) Falkland Islands (ISO 3166 digram; FIPS 10-4 territory code)
 f.k.a. or F/K/A – (i) Formerly Known As
 FKP – (s) Falkland Islands pound (ISO 4217 currency code)
 FKSM – (i) Fort Knox Supplemental Manual
 FKT – (i) Fastest Known Time

FL 
 fl – (p) floruit (Latin, "living") (genealogy)
 fL – (s) Femtolitre
 FL – (s) Florida (postal symbol)
 FLA – (p) Florida – (i) Front Line Assembly – Future Large Aircraft
 FLAC – (a/i) Free Lossless Audio Codec
 FLAC – (a/i) Free Legal Advice Centres
 FLAK – (p) FLugAbwehrKanone (German for "Anti-Aircraft Guns")
 FLB – (i) Forward Logistics Base
 FLET – (a/i) Forward Line of Enemy Troops
 FLG – (p) Falun Gong
 FLIP – (p) Flight Information Publication
 FLIR – (i) Forward Looking InfraRed (sensor)
 FLK – (s) Falkland Islands (ISO 3166 trigram)
 Also Funny-Looking Kid, a medical initialism for a young child with a mostly normal but somewhat unusual ("funny") appearance that raises the suspicion index for congenital disorder.  Used only before a medical diagnosis has determined the cause of the unusual appearance.
 FLOT – (a/i) Forward Line of Own Troops
 FLSA – (i) Fair Labor Standards Act
 FLQ – (i) Front de libération du Québec (French for "Québec Liberation Front")
 FLQ – (a) Free Legal Questions
 FLTSAT – (p) Fleet Satellite
 FLTSATCOM – (p) Fleet Satellite Communication System
 FLUBOS – (a) Fat, Lazy, Useless, Bag Of Shit

FM 
 FM – (s) Factory Mutual http://fmglobal.com
 fm – (s) Femtometre
 Fm – (s) Fermium
 FM
 (i) Federal Magistrate (Australian post-nominal)
 (s) Federated States of Micronesia (postal symbol; ISO 3166 digram; FIPS 10-4 territory code)
 (i) Field Manual
 Flight Manager
 Frequency Modulation (electronics)
 FMC
 (i) Federal Magistrates' Court (an Australian federal court, formerly FMS)
 Food Machinery Corporation (original name of the company now known as FMC Corporation)
 FMCA – (i) Federal Magistrates' Court of Australia (used for citing decisions of the FMC other than family law decisions)
 FMCAfam – (i) Federal Magistrates' Court of Australia: family (used for citing family law decisions of the FMC)
 FME – (i) Formal Methods Europe
 FMECA – (i) Failure Modes and Effect Criticality Analysis
 FMJD – (i) Fédération Mondiale du Jeu de Dames
 FMLA – (i) Family Medical Leave Act
 Fmr – Former (as in "Fmr. president")
 fMRI – (i) Functional Magnetic Resonance Imaging
 FMS
 (i) Federal Magistrates Service (an Australian federal court, now FMC)
 (i) Flight Management System
 Foreign Military Sales
 FMSF – (i) False Memory Syndrome Foundation
 FMTV – (i) Family of Medium Tactical Vehicles
 FMCG – (i) (Fast-Moving Consumer Goods)

FN 
 fN – (s) Femtonewton
 FNA – (i) Functional Needs Analysis

FO 
 fo – (s) Faroese language (ISO 639-1 code)
 FO –  (s) Faroe Islands (ISO 3166 digram; FIPS 10-4 territory code) – (i) Force Operations (military) – Forward Observer – Frame Optional (military symbology)
 FOAD – (a) Fuck Off And Die
 FOAF – (a) Friend Of A friend
 FoB – (i) Free On Board (shipping)
 FOB – (i/a) Forward Operating Base
 FOC – (i) Full Operational Capability – First of Class
 FoE – (p) Friends of the Earth
 FOGC – (i) Federal Oil and Gas Council
 FOH – (a) Front Of House
 FOIA – (a) Freedom of Information Act
 FOM – (a) Federation Object Model
 FOMO – (a) Fear of missing out
 FONSI – (a) Finding of No Significant Impact
 FOO – (a) Forward Observation Officer
 FOR – (i) Field Of Regard – Frame Of Reference
 Fortran – (p) The IBM Mathematical FORmula TRANslating System (programming language)
 FOS – (i) Florida Ornithological Society – Full Operational Status
 FoS – (i) Family of Systems
 FOSE – (p) Fallout 3 Script Extender
 FOSE – (a) Federal Office Systems Expo
 FOT – (i) Free on truck
 FOTA – (i) Fellow of the Orthodontic Technicians Association
 FOTC – Flight of the Conchords
 FOUO – (i) For Official Use Only
 FOV – (i) Field Of View

FP 
 FP – (s) French Polynesia (FIPS 10-4 territory code)
 FPF
 (i) Federação Portuguesa de Futebol ("Portuguese Football Federation" in that language)
 Final Protective Fire
 fps – (s) frames per second (motion pictures, television, computer graphics)
 FPS
 (i) Fire Prevention System
 First-person shooter (computer/video games)
 FOOP – (s) Friends Of Organ Pipes (Volunteer group)

FQ 
 FQ – (s) Baker Island (FIPS 10-4 territory code) – French Southern and Antarctic Territories (ISO 3166 digram; obsolete 1979)
 FQDN – (i) Fully Qualified Domain Name

FR 
 fr – (i) For real
 fr – (s) French language (ISO 639-1 code)
 Fr – (s) Francium
 FR – (s) France (FIPS 10-4 country code; ISO 3166 digram)
 fra – (s) French language (ISO 639-2 code)
 FRA
 (i) Federal Railroad Administration
 (s) France (ISO 3166 trigram)
 FRAGO – (p) Fragmentary Order (military)
 FRAND – (a) Fair, reasonable, and non-discriminatory (concept in standards-setting and intellectual property law)
 FRCP
 (i) Federal Rules of Civil Procedure
 Fellow of the Royal College of Physicians
 FRICBM – (i) Full Range ICBM
 frr – (s) North Frisian language (ISO 639-2 code)
 FRR
 (s) Falls Road Railroad (reporting mark)
 (i) Federaţia Română de Radioamatorism (Romanian, "Romanian Amateur Radio Federation")
 (i) Fix, Rebuild, Replace
 Federaţia Română de Rugby (Romanian, "Romanian Rugby (Union) Federation")
 FRO – (s) Faroe Islands (ISO 3166 trigram)
 FRS
 (i) Fellow of the Royal Society
 U.S. Federal Reserve System
 FRSA – (i) Fellow of the Royal Society of Art
 FRSL  – (i) Fellow of the Royal Society of Literature
 fry – (s) West Frisian language (ISO 639-2 code)
 FRY – (i) Federal Republic of Yugoslavia

FS 
 fs – (s) Femtosecond
 fS – (s) Femtosiemens
 FS
 (i) Fire Support (military)
 (s) French Southern and Antarctic Territories (FIPS 10-4 territory code)
 FSA
 (i) Fire Support Area
 UK Food Standards Agency
  Functional Solution Analysis
 FSB
 (i) Federal'naya Sluzhba Bezopasnosti Rossiyskoi Federatsii (Федера́льная слу́жба безопа́сности Росси́йской Федера́ции, Russian "Federal Security Service of the Russian Federation", succeeded the FSK in 1995)
 Forward Support Battalion
 FSC
 (i) Federal Supply Classification
 (a) Forest Stewardship Council (ecological pressure group
 FSCL – (i) Fire Support Co-ordination Line
 FSE – (i) Fire Support Element
 F&SF – (i) (The Magazine of) Fantasy & Science Fiction
 FSF – (i) Free Software Foundation
 FSH – (i) Follicle-stimulating hormone
 FSI – (i) Fuel Stratified Injection
 FSK – (i) Federal'naya Sluzhba Kontrrazvedki (Федера́льная Слу́жба Контрразве́дки, Russian "Federal Counterintelligence Service", succeeded the KGB in 1991)
 FSM
 (s) Federated States of Micronesia (ISO 3166 trigram)
 (i) Flying Spaghetti Monster (satirical religion)
 FSO
 (i) Fire Support Officer
 Flotilla Staff Officer
 Foreign Service Officer
 FSS – (i) Fire Support Station
 FSSP – (i) Families of Structurally Similar Proteins
 FST
 (i) Finance Support Team
 Finlands Svenska Television (Finland's Swedish-language television)
 Future Soviet Tank (Cold War era)
 FSTC – (i) Foreign Science Technology Center (now NGIC) 
 FSV
 (i) Fire Support Vehicle
 Fisheries Survey Vessel
 Flexible Sender Validation
 Fort St. Vrain
 Fußball und Sportverein (German "Football and Sport Association", as in FSV Mainz)

FT 
 fT – (s) Femtotesla
 FTC – (i) Federal Trade Commission
 FTE – (i) Full Time Equivalent
 FTHGOAC - For The Highest Good Of All Concerned
 FTL – (i) Faster Than Light
 FTP – (i) File Transfer Protocol
 FTS
 (i) Flight Termination System used during some rocket launches
 Follow-the-sun
 Fuck That Shit
 FTSE – (a/i) Financial Times Stock Exchange ("footsie")
 FTW – (i) For The Win (a commonly used phrase used online to indicate success), Fuck the World, Forever Together Wherever (gang slogan)

FU 
 FU – (s) Smoke (METAR Code)
 FUBAR – (a) Fucked/Fouled Up Beyond All Recognition/Repair
 f/u/b/o – (i) For the use and benefit of (found in legal documents)
 FUCK – (a) For, Unlawful, Carnal, Knowledge (Van Halen album title)
 FUD – (a) Fear, Uncertainty & Doubt (marketing strategy)
 FUGAZI (acronym) – (a) British/American Army slang, then Video Gamer FPS slang for Fucked Up, Got Ambushed, Zipped In. 
 ful – (s) Fula language (ISO 639-2 code)

FV 
 fV – (s) Femtovolt

FW 
 fW – (s) Femtowatt
 FW – (s) Forward
 F/W – (i) Fixed Wing
 FWC – (i) Football World Cup
 FWF – (i) Fixed Word Format
 FWI – (i) French West Indies
 FWIW – (i) For What It's Worth
 FWS – (i) U.S. Fish and Wildlife Service
 FWT – (i) Fresh Water Tank

FX 
 FX – (a) Firefox – Fox Extended – (s) Metropolitan France (ISO 3166 digram; obsolete 1997) – Special effect
 FXX – (s) Metropolitan France (ISO 3166 trigram; obsolete 1997)

FY 
 fy – (s) West Frisian language (ISO 639-1 code)
 FY – (i) Fiscal Year – (s) Former Yugoslav Republic of Macedonia (NATO country code)
 FYA – (i) For Your Agenda
 FYDP – (i) Five-Year Defense Plan (U.S.)
 FYI – (i) For Your Information
 FYI&A – (i) For Your Information and Action
 FYROM – (a) Former Yugoslav Republic of Macedonia, currently North Macedonia

FZ 
 FZDZ – (s) Freezing Drizzle (METAR Code)
 FZFG – (s) Freezing Fog (METAR Code)
 FZRA – (s) Freezing Rain (METAR Code)

References 

Acronyms F